Avianca El Salvador serves the following destinations:

References

Lists of airline destinations